Linscott may refer to:
Linscott, Nebraska
Linscott (surname), people named Linscott

See also
Williams-Linscott House